The 1908 Illinois gubernatorial election was held on November 3, 1908.

Incumbent Republican Governor Charles S. Deneen defeated Democratic nominee and former Vice President of the United States Adlai E. Stevenson I with 47.64% of the vote.

Primary elections
Primary elections were held on August 8, 1908.

Democratic primary

Candidates
Charles F. Gunther, former City Treasurer of Chicago
Eugene Kimbrough
J. Hamilton Lewis, former U.S. Representative for Washington's at-large district
John P. McGoorty, State Representative
James O. Monroe, candidate for the 11th district in 1902 and 1904
Douglas Pattison, State Representative
Adlai E. Stevenson I, former Vice President of the United States

Results

Republican primary

Candidates
Charles S. Deneen, incumbent Governor
Richard Yates Jr., former Governor

Results

Prohibition primary

Candidates
Eugene W. Chafin, candidate for Attorney General in 1904 
Daniel R. Sheen, former State Representative

Results

Socialist primary

Candidates
James H. Brower, candidate for Lieutenant Governor in 1904

Results

General election

Candidates
James H. Brower, Socialist
Charles S. Deneen, Republican 
Gustav A. Jennings, Socialist Labor
George W. McCaskrin, Independence League, former Mayor of Rock Island
Daniel R. Sheen, Prohibition
Adlai E. Stevenson, Democratic

Results

See also
1908 Illinois lieutenant gubernatorial election

References

Bibliography

1908
Illinois
Gubernatorial
November 1908 events